ACS Applied Materials & Interfaces is a peer-reviewed scientific journal that was established in 2009 by the American Chemical Society. Originally published monthly, the journal became biweekly in 2013 and weekly in 2015. The current editor-in-chief is Kirk S. Schanze (University of Texas San Antonio). The journal covers research on advanced active and passive electronic/optical materials, coatings, colloids, biomaterials and bio-interfaces, polymers, hybrid and composite materials; and friction and wear.

Abstracting and indexing

The journal is abstracted and indexed in: CAS, MEDLINE/PubMed, Current Contents, and Science Citation Index Expanded. According to the Journal Citation Reports, the journal has a 2021 impact factor of 10.383.

See also
ACS Applied Energy Materials

References

External links

Applied Materials & Interfaces
Publications established in 2009
Monthly journals
English-language journals
Materials science journals